Yeboah or Yebuah pronounced /yɛ bɔa/ is a Akan surname meaning "our helper". Notable people with the surname include:

Daniel Nana Yeboah (born 1984), Ghanaian footballer
Daniel Yeboah (born 1984), Ivorian footballer
Emmanuel Ofosu Yeboah (born 1977), Ghanaian athlete and disability activist
Emmanuel Yeboah (Born 1997), Ghanaian athlete 
Godfred Yeboah (1980–2021), Ghanaian footballer
Irena Yebuah Tiran (born 1974), Slovenian mezzo-soprano opera singer of Ghana descent
John Yeboah (born 2000), German footballer
Kelvin Yeboah (born 2000), Ghanaian-Italian footballer
Kenny Yeboah (born 1998), American football player
Kofi Yeboah Schulz (born 1989), German footballer
Kwame Yeboah (born 1994), Australian footballer
Philip Yeboah (born 2002), Ghanaian footballer
Samuel Ayew Yeboah (born 1988), Ghanaian footballer
Samuel Yeboah (born 1986), Ghanaian footballer
Tony Yeboah (born 1966), Ghanaian footballer
Vida Yeboah (1944-2006), Ghanaian educator, politician and civic leader
Yaw Yeboah (born 1997), Ghanaian footballer

Surnames of Akan origin